Flight of the Flynns is the debut album of American indie rock band Kunek, now known as Other Lives. The album was released physically on September 12, 2006, on the label Play Tyme Entertainment. With influences from European folk music, Post-Rock and Classical, the project initially began as an instrumental concept album, before songs were shortened and lyrics were added a year prior to release.

Track listing

Reception

Critical 
Flight of the Flynns received mixed reviews upon initial release. Glide Magazine gave the album 5/11 stars, stating "Kunek doesn’t belong in the ambient bin, as it’s a bit more Badly Drawn Boy with a couple of Beatles moments thrown in, but most fans of the genre would appreciate the album.". Independent artist review site DOA called the vocals "a little Radioheaded", but stated that "In the spirit of the concept album, Kunek arrange choice tracks that bleed into one another nicely"

References 

2006 debut albums
Other Lives (band) albums